Lance Anoa'i is a  professional wrestler who currently wrestles for Major League Wrestling (MLW) under his real name, and is the current MLW World Tag Team Champion, in his first reign. He is a member of the Anoaʻi family.

Early life 
His father is Samu, who competed in the World Wrestling Federation as a member of The Wild Samoans and The Headshrinkers.  His uncles are Afa Jr. and L.A. Smooth.

Professional wrestling career

Independent circuit (2010–present) 

Lance debuted on April 3, 2010 in a winning effort for an event promoted by the National Wrestling League against Chrono Chris. He spent his early years in World Xtreme Wrestling, which is owned by his grandfather, Afa Anoaʻi. He often was involved in matches with his relatives Samu, Afa Jr. and Sean Maluta.

Lance wrestled for Maryland Championship Wrestling (MCW), debuting in August 2012. Lance made his debut for Pro Wrestling Syndicate (PWS) in 2012. At Supercard 2013, Lance was involved in a battle royal for the #1 Contendership for the PWS Heavyweight Championship on Night 1 and on Night 2, Lance had a match with Sonjay Dutt. Lance competed for the PWS Tri State Championship in a Six Way Match at PWS Return to Rahway on September 20, 2013, that included Craven Varro, Starman, Facade, Pat Buck and The Drunken Swashbuckler. At the Shane Shamrock Memorial Cup 2013, he wrestled Luke Hawx on August 10, 2013 and lasted until the semi-finals.

In 2013, he made his first of many appearances in House of Hardcore (HOH). In April 2019, he won the 23rd annual East Coast Wrestling Association (ECWA) Super 8 Tournament.

WWE tryouts (2015, 2017, 2019) 
On the January 2, 2015 edition of WWE SmackDown, he teamed with Rhett Titus in a losing effort against The Ascension. On February 1, 2017, he competed in a losing effort at a WWE NXT event against The Authors of Pain. This appearance was related to a tryout he was having with WWE. In April 2019 he competed at another WWE tryout. On the May 27, 2019, edition of WWE Raw, Anoa'i faced Shane McMahon representing the Anoaʻi family. He would lose the match by submission, after Drew McIntyre attacked him. After the match he was beat down by McMahon and McIntyre, before Roman Reigns made the save.

Major League Wrestling (2018–2019) 
On March 3, 2018, he made his debut with Major League Wrestling (MLW) at their event "Spring Break". In the match, he lost to Maxwell Jacob Friedman. In July 2018 he participated in the first-ever Battle Riot at the namesake event, which was won by Tom Lawlor. In October 2018, he started teaming with his father Samu in MLW as The Samoan Island Tribe. In early 2019 he would feud with Rich Swann resulting in losses in singles and tag team matches. In April 2019, he competed in the second Battle Riot, again unsuccessfully.

Return to Major League Wrestling (2023–present)
On January 7th, 2023, Anoa'i as a member of The Samoan SWAT Team with Juicy Finau defeated Hustle & Power (EJ Nduka and Calvin Tankman) for the MLW World Tag Team Championships at MLW Blood and Thunder.

Championships and accomplishments
East Coast Wrestling Association
ECWA Super 8 Tournament (2019)
Major League Wrestling
 MLW World Tag Team Championship (1 time, current) - with Juice Finau
 Pro Wrestling Illustrated
 Ranked No. 395 of the top 500 singles wrestlers in the PWI 500 in 2019
World Xtreme Wrestling
WXW Blast Television Championship
WXW Elite Tag Team Championship
WXW Ultimate Heavyweight Championship (4 times)
WXW Ultimate Hybrid Championship  (5 times, current)
Pro Wrestling eXpress
PWX Heavyweight Championship

References

External links
 

Living people
Sportspeople from Allentown, Pennsylvania
American male professional wrestlers
American professional wrestlers of Samoan descent
Professional wrestlers from Pennsylvania
Anoa'i family
1992 births